Rush Valley is a  long north-trending valley in the southeast of Tooele County, Utah. The region of Rush Lake is a marsh region, fed by various streams from the mountain regions east and west.

A southern section of the Tooele Army Depot lies in the valley's center-northeast, at the southwest foothills of the Oquirrh Mountains.

Valley description
The valley widens in the south, making two sections, a due-south section, and a region to the southeast. The southern section contains the communities of Vernon and Faust, with Faust north, closer to the valley's center-south. Vernon is in flatlands fed by the Sheeprock Mountains or foothills, southwest, south, and southeast.

A ridge north separates Rush Valley from Cedar Valley to the east. Lofgreen is in mountain foothills southwest, and Pehrson with Topliff are in lower elevation regions.

The Rush Valley Centerpoint is north of Faust, and the small James Walter Fitzgerald Wildlife Management Area.

Access
Utah State Route 36 (SR-36) transects the center of the valley, starting from a section at the northeast, from Tooele and Stockton. It turns and leaves the valley's southeast to meet the region of Eureka and Silver City in the East Tintic Mountains.

Utah State Route 73 (SR-73) joins SR-36 at the valley's center after traversing the south of the Oquirrh Mountains in the valley's southeast (the north perimeter of the southeast section).

From the West, Utah State Route 199 (SR-199) enters the valley center from Dugway, and its canyon route through the western mountains is the dividing line between the Stansbury Mountains north, and the Onaqui Mountains south.

References

External links

 Map: South Mountain & Rush Lake region, topographic map (topoquest)

Landforms of Tooele County, Utah
Valleys of Utah
Valleys of the Great Basin